Shirin is a 2008 Iranian drama film directed by Abbas Kiarostami. The film is considered by some critics as a notable twist in the artistic career of Kiarostami.

The film features close-ups of many notable Iranian actresses and French actress Juliette Binoche as they watch a film based on a part mythological Persian romance tale of Khosrow and Shirin, with themes of female self-sacrifice. The film has been described as "a compelling exploration of the relationship between image, sound and female spectatorship." The film depicts the audience's emotional involvement with the story. The story is read between the tragic and kitsch by a cast of narrators led by Manoucher Esmaieli and is accompanied by a historical "film score" by Morteza Hananeh and Hossein Dehlavi.

The film's production is replete with curious anecdotes. According to some reports, the women were filmed individually in Kiarostami's living room, with the director asking them to cast their gaze at a mere series of dots above the camera. The director has also stated that, during the filming process, he had no idea what film they were watching, and settled on the Khosrow and Shirin myth only after shooting had concluded. In Taste of Shirin (2008, 27 minutes), a documentary by Hamideh Razavi on the making of the film, one can see how the film really was shot. The brief appearance of Juliette Binoche in the film came as a coincidence. She was visiting Kiarostami and Iran as a guest during Shirin's project and she became interested to participate in the project.

It was first screened at the 65th Venice International Film Festival.

Cast
More than 100 actresses took part in this film. Some of them are:

 Juliette Binoche
 Taraneh Alidoosti
 Niki Karimi
 Mahtab Keramati
 Hedieh Tehrani
 Mahnaz Afshar
 Pegah Ahangarani
 Zar Amir Ebrahimi
 Shirin Bina
 Khatereh Asadi
 Vishka Asayesh
 Rana Azadivar
 Pantea Bahram
 Pouri Banai
 Afsaneh Bayegan
 Sahar Dolatshahi
 Setareh Eskandari
 Golshifteh Farahani
 Shaghayegh Farahani
 Bita Farahi
 Elsa Firouz Azar
 Fatemeh Goudarzi
 Azita Hajian
 Leila Hatami
 Irene
 Behnaz Jafari
 Negar Javaherian
 Falamak Jonidi
 Hamideh Kheirabadi
 Gohar Kheirandish
 Niku Kheradmand
 Sara Khoeniha
 Baran Kosari
 Fatemah Motamed-Aria
 Shabnam Moghaddami
 Ladan Mostofi
 Yekta Naser
 Roya Nonahali
 Zhale Olov
 Rabeh Oskouie
 Mahaya Petrossian
 Leili Rashidi
 Katayoun Riahi
 Homeira Riazi
 Elnaz Shakerdoust
 Hanieh Tavassoli
 Roya Taymourian
 Sahar Valadbeigi
 Laya Zanganeh
 Merila Zarei
 Niousha Zeighami
 Bahareh Afshari

See also
List of Iranian films
To Each His Own Cinema, an anthology film where Kiarostami tells a similar story involving women watching Romeo and Juliet.

References

External links
 Deborah Young, "Iranian film 'Shirin' a rewarding challenge" (Reuters, 2008)
 

Films directed by Abbas Kiarostami
2008 films
Iranian drama films